Lee Eui-geun (7 November 1938 – 21 April 2009) is the governor of Gyeongsangbuk-do, a province in eastern South Korea.  He is a member of the Hannara party.  He has served three consecutive terms in the position, beginning in 1995.  His name has been mentioned as a possible future candidate for prime minister. 

Born in 1938 in Iseo-myeon, Cheongdo County, Gyeongsangbuk-do, he attended local elementary and middle schools, then transferred to Daegu Commercial High School, from which he graduated in 1958.  He then went on to receive a BS in Economics from Yeungnam University in 1964. He began working for the Daegu and Gyeongbuk governments in 1961.

Lee has received honorary doctorates from Khabarovsk State Academy of Economics and Law, Yeungnam University, and the Catholic University of Daegu.  He was also awarded South Korea's Order of National Merit in 1988.

He died from prostate cancer in 2009.
He is lived on by his wife, Lee Myeong Sook, and his two sons, Lee Chang Hoon and Lee Kwang Hoon.

See also
List of Koreans
Politics of South Korea

Notes

References

External links
Gyeongbuk provincial website, containing English-language profile of the governor

People from North Gyeongsang Province
1938 births
2009 deaths
Deaths from prostate cancer
Liberty Korea Party politicians
Yeungnam University alumni